"Getting Late" is a song by performed by Floetry, issued as the third and final single from their debut studio album Floetic. It was written by Natalie Stewart and Marsha Ambrosius along with Vidal Davis; and it peaked at #31 on the Billboard R&B chart in 2003. The song was sampled on Drake's song "Flight's Booked", from his album Honestly, Nevermind.

Chart positions

References

External links
 
 

2002 songs
2003 singles
DreamWorks Records singles
Floetry songs
Polydor Records singles
Songs written by Marsha Ambrosius
Songs written by Vidal Davis
Soul ballads
2000s ballads